Morocco competed at the 2008 Summer Paralympics in Beijing, China.

Medallists

Sports

Athletics

Men's track

Men's field

Women's track

Women's field

Powerlifting

Men

Women

See also
Morocco at the Paralympics
Morocco at the 2008 Summer Olympics

References

Nations at the 2008 Summer Paralympics
2008
Paralympics